Anton Alekseyevich Krotov (born 28 January 1998) is a Russian football player.

Club career
He made his debut in the Russian Football National League for Luch Vladivostok on 14 November 2018 in a game against Baltika Kaliningrad.

References

External links
 Profile by Russian Football National League

1998 births
Sportspeople from Primorsky Krai
Living people
Russian footballers
Association football midfielders
FC Luch Vladivostok players
FC Irtysh Omsk players
FC Sokol Saratov players
FC Volga Ulyanovsk players
Russian First League players
Russian Second League players